Les Roches is a private hospitality school with two campuses located in the French-speaking parts of Switzerland. It was purchased in 2016 by Eurazeo.

Accreditation

Quality accreditation by Neche (UK).

Academic structure

True to the Swiss educational model, the LRG-UAS program includes a preparatory year where courses are focused on hotel operations in a craft-based learning environment and building experience through a hospitality industryinternship. For students who choose International Hospitality Management, the first semester of the preparatory year will be taught on the Glion campus of GIHE. For the Food, Beverage and Operations Management specialization, the students live and learn on the Bluche campus.

Upon successful completion of the preparatory year students continue on to the administration and management modules for hospitality and service organizations. LRG employs only faculty members who hold credentials appropriate to the level they teach and requires that faculty members keep up-to-date with the current industry trends through contact with the profession, as per the federal requirements for the UAS accreditation.

The modules of the LRGUAS program are valued using the European Credit Transfer System (ECTS) with each year of the program worth 60 ECTS for a total of 180 ECTS. The UAS qualification allows students to enter Master programs or transfer credits into European universities.

Campus

The preparatory year of the International Hotel Management specialization takes place on the Glion-sur-Montreux campus of Glion Institute of Higher Education. Students then move into the official Bachelor of Science in Hospitality Management program on the Bulle campus for the remaining three years. The entire Food, Beverage and Operations Management specialization takes place on the Bluche campus. GIHE and LRB are accredited by the New England Association of Schools and Colleges (NEASC). These institutions are not a part of LRG-UAS although the faculty, campuses and facilities such as the libraries and student housing are shared with these institutions.

Bulle campus

The three-year degree section of the Bachelor of Science in Hospitality Management with a specialization in International Hospitality Management takes place on the Bulle Campus. The library has over 10’000 books and professional journals, thousands of CDs and DVDs and students can also access more than 15,000 on-line journals and publications. Bulle campus facilities include a catered restaurant, student lounge, and students have access to a fitness center through a school sponsored membership.

Bluche campus

This campus offers the specialization in Food, Beverage and Operations Management.
This campus stretches across the village of Bluche in the heart of the Swiss Alps. The Bluche campus features three academic wings with 30 classrooms, two computer labs, one demonstration kitchen and demonstration bar, a reception and housekeeping practical classroom, mock hotel room, two professional kitchens and two auditoriums. The renovated library offers 10,000 academic titles and 2,000 DVDs and CDs in addition to the 15,000 online academic journals and the separate media center. Student accommodations are spread throughout the village in 16 separate buildings with different types of accommodations buildings. The Bluche campus provides a number of sport and recreational facilities.

Notes and references

See also
List of largest universities by enrollment in Switzerland

External links

Hospitality schools in Switzerland
Private universities and colleges in Europe